Westwood Cross is a British, open, pedestrianised shopping centre at Westwood, Kent. It opened in 2005, and since 2008 has incorporated a casino, cinema and bingo hall.

History

Westwood Cross is situated on the former Haine Hospital site, which closed in June 1997 and was demolished in 2003.

Developers claimed the 2005 Westwood Cross created 1,500 jobs in the Broadstairs area.

Kent County Council's decision to allow a 2008 expansion including leisure and gambling facilities was controversial. Church leaders said its location was tempting people who had never gambled before to give it a go. The scheme was eventually approved by the House of Lords.

In 2010, additional retail outlets were created by conversion of a former adjoining Wickes store.

A 2015 car park collapse beneath the Westwood Cross Primark store revealed underground tunnels believed to have been constructed during World War I training exercises. Researchers suggested they were subsequently used as air raid shelters for servicemen at Haine Hospital, and then sealed up.

Kent Police put a 48 hour dispersal order on Westwood Cross in 2022 to control anti-social behaviour. The extra police powers were introduced after reports of teens abusing shop staff, shoplifting and nuisance scooter issues.

References

External links 
 
 Official website

Shopping centres in Kent
Thanet